Roark Creek is a stream in Taney County, Missouri. The stream begins at the junction of the West and East forks near the village of Garber. From there the streamflow southeast to its junction with the White River in Branson.  The Missouri Pacific Railroad line follows the stream and the West Fork Roark Creek northwest to Reeds Spring.

The source coordinates are: ; and the confluence coordinates are: .

Roark Creek has the name of the local Roark family.

See also
List of rivers of Missouri

References

Rivers of Stone County, Missouri
Rivers of Taney County, Missouri
Rivers of Missouri